Rodica Lucia Sutzu (15 April 1913 - 8 May 1979) was a Romanian composer and pianist who studied with Nadia Boulanger and served as the Romanian Radio piano soloist for almost 20 years.

Sutzu was born in Iași to Elena Jules Cazaban and Rudolf Sutzu. Her father was a publicist and a descendant of the aristocratic Soutzos family. Her mother came from a family of artists and musicians which included the composer Mansi Barberis. Sutzu married Radu Diamandi Demetrescu, who served as the chief of staff for Romanian Deputy Prime Minister Mihai Antonescu.

Sutzu attended the Iasi Conservatory and the Ecole Normale in Paris. Her teachers included Diran Alexanian, Nadia Boulanger, Aspasia Burada, Alfred Cortot,  George Dandelot, Petre Elinescu, Gavriil Galinescu, Blanche Basscouret de Geraldi, Lazare Levy, Sofia Teodoreanu,  and Ginette Waldmeyer.

Sutzu was the Romanian Radio piano soloist from 1937 to 1955, accompanying artists such as Mircea Barsan, George Enesco, and Theodor Lupu, and performing with major orchestras as a soloist. She became a piano professor at the George Enesco Music School in 1959, and lectured at the Bucharest Pedagogic Institute until 1968. She was awarded the George Enesco Composition Prize in 1933, and the Workers’ Medal in 1953.

Her compositions included:

Chamber 

Piece, opus 4 (cello and piano)

Prelude, opus 28 (oboe and piano)

Piano 

Ballad in c minor

Concert Waltz (two pianos)

Etude, opus 12

Five Miniatures, opus 27

Five Pieces

Obsession, opus 1

Perpetuum Mobile, opus 11

Rondo, opus 13

Sonata in C Major, opus 7

Suite, opus 25

Suite for Children

Three Nocturnes, opus 10

Toccata, opus 23

Two Preludes, opus 5

Virtelnita, opus 21

Theatre 

Allons y d’un pas Flaneur (play; based on text by L. Delesco)

Ghici-ghici (puppet theatre; based on text by N. Stroescu)

Tu Comprendras (play; based on text by E. Peretz)

Vocal 

Ballad (six voices, two pianos, and orchestra)

Divertisement, opus 22 (chorus)

“Five Love Songs” (based on text by Armenian troubadours)

“Gazel, opus 15” (based on text by Mihai Eminescu)

“Imi Sint Ochii Plini de Soare” (two voices)

“Prayer, opus 20”

“Songs to verses of Eminescu and Otilia Cazimir”

“Three Miniatures, opus 16” (text by Cazimir)

“Waltz for Voice and Piano, opus 24”

References 

Romanian composers
Women composers
Romanian pianists
1913 births
1979 deaths
Musicians from Iași
Soutzos family